SYX may refer to:

 IATA airport code for Sanya Phoenix International Airport
 Skyway Airlines, airline code
 Smalltalk YX, an open source implementation of the Smalltalk-80 programming language